Garam is a rural locality (a settlement) in Yeravninsky District, Republic of Buryatia, Russia. The population was 208 as of 2010. There are 2 streets.

Geography 
Garam is located near the Bolshoy Yeravna lake, part of the Yeravna-Khorga Lake System. 10 km northwest of Sosnovo-Ozerskoye, the nearest rural locality.

References 

Rural localities in Yeravninsky District